Felix Aprahamian (5 June 1914 – 15 January 2005), born Apraham Felix Bartev Aprahamian, was an English music critic, writer, concert promoter, publisher's adviser, supporter of young musicians, and friend to some of the last century's most notable musicians.   Aprahamian, however, usually described himself as a music critic.

He was considered an urbane, flamboyant and warm-hearted man, described by his old friend and colleague John Amis (in The Guardian, 21 January 2005) as "a mixture of characters from Proust and P.G. Wodehouse".

Background

Felix Aprahamian was born in London in 1914.  Christened Apraham Felix Bartev Aprahamian, he changed his name by deed poll to just Felix Aprahamian. His father changed his surname from Hovanessian, deciding to take his own father's Christian name, Apraham, and attach the patronymic –ian, to form Aprahamian, or son of Apraham.

At the age of 17, Aprahamian became Assistant Secretary to the Organ Music Society, and he developed into a highly proficient keyboard player. He later recalled that it was his passion for music which led him to fail his school matriculation: he was self-taught in almost every area of music, as well as literature and the other arts. In 1933, he went to France with two friends (Douglas Peart and Ernest Chapman) to visit the ageing Frederick Delius in Grez-sur-Loing, and in Paris he met Charles-Marie Widor.

Early career

In 1935 Aprahamian was made Secretary of the Organ Music Society, and the same year one of his first articles, "Eugene Goossens in London", was published in the Musical Times. During World War II, he worked as Concert Director of the London Philharmonic Orchestra and from 1942 onwards he helped Tony Mayer organise the extraordinary series Concerts de Musique Française at the Wigmore Hall in London. In 1946 he joined United Music Publishers as a consultant and, with Mayer at the French Embassy, played a central role in bringing French music to post-war British audiences. In 1948 he became Deputy Music Critic of the Sunday Times and stayed for 41 years; his reviews were notable for their prose and enthusiasm.

He first corresponded with Olivier Messiaen in 1936 and was responsible for organising the first complete performance in England of Messiaen's La Nativité du Seigneur, played by the composer himself at St Alban's Church, Holborn, in 1938. They developed a warm friendship which lasted until the composer's death in 1992. His first encounter with Francis Poulenc was well before the start of World War II; their first meeting was at J. & W. Chester's music shop, when he asked the composer to sign a photograph, duly inscribed "Qui est ce monstre?" ("Who is this monster?"). The two became firm friends and Aprahamian often visited Poulenc in Paris. His talent for making friends such as these led to many memorable events at his house in Muswell Hill. Poulenc first played through his Elégie in memory of Dennis Brain there, and in 1945 Messiaen and Yvonne Loriod gave a private rendition of Messiaen's Visions de l'Amen before the British première.

Among British composers, his greatest passion was for Delius (he was an adviser to the Delius Trust from 1961, and later the President of the Society), and he was on amicable terms with Benjamin Britten, William Walton and Michael Tippett: while at the LPO, he was instrumental in arranging the premiere of Tippett's A Child of Our Time in 1944. Other friends included the conductors Thomas Beecham, Victor de Sabata, Roger Désormière, Ernest Ansermet and Charles Münch, as well as the singer Maggie Teyte, the cellist Pierre Fournier, the pianist Monique Haas, and the composer Florent Schmitt.

The organ and organ music

For much of the 20th century Aprahamian occupied a pivotal position in the organ world and, most notably, the 'Organ Reform Movement' from its earliest years in the UK.  Arguably its most noteworthy achievement, the organ of the Royal Festival Hall, is due to him.  He was consulted by the London County Council (seemingly by telephone) to recommend a consultant for the proposed organ for the new Royal Festival Hall.  His immediate (and sole) nomination was Ralph Downes who was duly appointed and both designed the organ and saw its construction through to completion, thereafter remaining curator of the organ until his death.  Downes initiated a series of weekday concerts which brought the organ to a new, wider audience, also appearing sometimes as performer.  For these concerts Aprahamian provided brilliantly-written programme notes which were at the same time elegant, concise and authoritative.  He also reviewed the performances in his weekly column as deputy music critic (to Desmond Shawe-Taylor) of The Sunday Times.    

Organ music was a lifelong enthusiasm of Aprahamian, and his vast library of organ music is now at the Royal College of Organists. The installation in his Muswell Hill house of an organ inherited from his friend André Marchal in 1982 has been a constant musical inspiration to his protégé, the organist and composer David Liddle, who became David Aprahamian Liddle shortly after Felix's death, as a tribute to his mentor and friend.

Honours

In 1994, Aprahamian was made an Honorary Member of the Royal Philharmonic Society, the only music critic to receive this accolade, and he was touched to be in the same company as Berlioz, Ravel and Sibelius. He was "Membre d'Honneur" of the Centre International Albert Roussel. Aside from music his passions included tropical fish, Proust and his Japanese garden (a miniature Giverny in London N10).

Nigel Simeone has written a series of books based on materials in Felix Aprahamian's archives which are listed in the Bibliography. Aprahamian never wrote his planned autobiography, but Lewis Foreman is currently working on the detailed documentation of his life and work.

Following Aprahamian's death

On 20 February 2006, Putney Music (London) held an evening in celebration of its long-time President: "Remembering Felix Aprahamian – our late President Emeritus" was chaired by John Amis. Speakers included Lewis Foreman, Peter Andry, Gordon Honey, Geoffrey Ford, Armen Tertsakian, Nigel Simeone, David Aprahamian Liddle and David Cairns.

In 2015 the Boydell Press published a book supported with many photographs and illustrations, edited by Lewis and Susan Foreman, entitled "Felix Aprahamian - Diaries and Selected Writings on Music."

Further reading
Simeone, Nigel: "Bien Cher Félix" – Letters from Olivier Messiaen and Yvonne Loriod to Felix Aprahamian (Cambridge, 1998).
Simeone, Nigel: Poulenc in London and Dreamland – His Letters to Felix Aprahamian, Commentaries on Songs and London Concerts (Cambridge, 2000).
Simeone, Nigel: "Dear Maître Tournemire" – Charles Tournemire's Correspondence with Felix Aprahamian and his Visit to London in 1936 (Bangor Monographs in Musicology, 2003).
Simeone, Nigel: French Music in Wartime London – The Festival of French Music and the Concerts de Musique Française (Bangor Monographs in Musicology, 2005).
Simeone, Nigel: In Memoriam – Felix Aprahamian (Musical Times, Spring 2005, pp. 4–5).
Foreman, Lewis and Susan: Felix Aprahamian - Diaries and Selected Writings on Music (Boydell Press, 2015, 422p, .

References
Amis, John: "Felix Aprahamian", obituary, The Guardian, 21 January 2005.
Foreman, Lewis: "Felix Aprahamian", obituary, The Independent, 18 January 2005.
Liddle, David Aprahamian: Recollections of Felix Aprahamian, February 2005
"Felix Aprahamian", Obituary, The Times, 20 January 2005
Delius Society tribute
Delius Society Journal

English music critics
1914 births
2005 deaths
British people of Armenian descent
Opera critics
Honorary Members of the Royal Philharmonic Society
People from Muswell Hill